Dr. Zhu Di (born May 1954) is a Chinese mechanical engineer, and a member of the Chinese Academy of Sciences since 2011. He is a professor at the Nanjing University of Aeronautics and Astronautics (NUAA), and served as the President of NUAA from September 2009 until June 2013, when he was replaced by Nie Hong.

Biography
Zhu Di was born May 1954 in Shenyang, Liaoning province. In 1985, he graduated from the department of mechanical engineering of NUAA with a Doctor of Engineering degree. From 1991 to 1992 he was a researcher at the University of Liverpool, England. From 1995 to 1999 he was a researcher at the University of Nebraska, United States. He has published about 200 research papers and holds 29 patents.

References

External links
 Zhu Di's page at NUAA

1954 births
Living people
Chinese mechanical engineers
Educators from Liaoning
Engineers from Liaoning
Members of the Chinese Academy of Sciences
Academic staff of Nanjing University of Aeronautics and Astronautics
Nanjing University of Aeronautics and Astronautics alumni
Presidents of Nanjing University of Aeronautics and Astronautics
People from Shenyang